Łupiny , ,  is a settlement in the administrative district of Gmina Słupsk, within Słupsk County, Pomeranian Voivodeship, in northern Poland.

Before 1945 the area of Farther Pomerania, where the settlement is located,  was part of Germany. For the post-war history of the region, see History of Pomerania.

The settlement has a population of 6.

References

Villages in Słupsk County